Gandasa is a Pakistani film in Punjabi language, released on 16 April 1991 by screenwriter Saleem Murad. The film was directed by Hasan Askari and produced by Jahangir Khan.

Cast
 Sultan Rahi
 Gori
 Anwar Khan
 Nida Mumtaz
 Shahida Mini
 Tanzeem Hassan
 Asim Bukhari
 Adeeb
 Humayun Qureshi
 Mehmood Aslam
 Rashid Mehmood
 Altaf Khan
 Raseela

History 
A 'Gandasa' is a Punjabi implement primarily used in cultivation and farming.  It consists of a long stick of wood (roughly the height of its user) with a wide blade attached to one end.  It resembles a very large axe, although it is used in a different manner.

The use of the gandasa as a weapon was made famous by the Lollywood film Maula Jatt (1979) and its sequels, in which the implement was portrayed as an excalibur-like weapon used in the Punjabi action films for fighting and killing other people.

Soundtrack
The music of Gandasa is composed by Wajahat Attre with lyrics by Ahmad Rahi.

Track listing

References

External links 
 

1991 films
1990s crime action films
Pakistani crime action films
Punjabi-language Pakistani films
1990s Punjabi-language films